Lausanne, alternately named Lausanne Landing of the 1790s–1820s was a small settlement at the mouth of Nesquehoning Creek on the Lehigh River in marshy delta-like flood plain.  Some historic references will mention the presence of a 'Landing Tavern' as the entirety of the town. Lausanne township was originally organized out of dense wilderness along an ancient Amerindian Trail, the "Warriors' Path" an important regional route as it connected the Susquehanna River settlements of the lower Wyoming Valley to those around Philadelphia. During the American Revolution, this route would become the rough 'Lausanne-Nescopeck Road', and after the turn of the century with a charter (1804), be improved into a toll road, the Lehigh and Susquehanna Turnpike. The fan-shaped plain provided some of the flattest landscape terrain in the entire area, and was able to support a few small farm plots, boat building, and a lumbermill.  With nascent industrialization hitting America, widespread local deforestation occurred to feed lumber mills and craft transports. Exacerbating local clearcutting was convenient river access, for the Lehigh could (at least, seasonally with preparation) support river arks.  The Nesquehoning Creek mouth issues behind a small river island and sits above the long curved lake-like upper pool of the Lehigh below the outlet of the gorge, and its delta's smoothly sloped sides made an attractive landing beach, giving name to the Inn.  With the popularity of the route and the roughness of the country, often called "The Switzerland of America" the location was a natural rest stop for the next leg to the north involved a steep climb and was over nine miles to the area of Beaver Meadows.  Hence early on it added 'Landing Tavern' to its nicknames. 
 

 
It was used initially by transient work crews timbering and building temporary river boats to haul cargo known as arks, a common solution to ship upstream resources out of the frontier.  As such early on it anchored a sawmill, tavern, crude housing, tool and work sheds, and in 1804–05, a toll house built for the Lehigh and Susquehanna turnpike, climbing the nearby ravine of Jean's Run as it began the sharp ascent up Broad Mountain to pass in succession along the banks of the Black Creek, Quakake Creek, Beaver Creek valleys in (the future) Carbon County, Pennsylvania then climb Hazel Creek into Luzerne County up to the flat area of the Mountain pass, a marshy saddle which would become Hazelton, PA near the 1780s settlement of St John's along the descent to Nescopeck on the Susquehanna – PA 93 follows much of the same road bed, save for starting at an elevated altitude from the nearby town of Nesquehoning, PA via a high level bridge.

Old Lausanne Township
At the close of the American war of independence, into the early United States constitutional era, the rough steep banks of the Lehigh Valley area above the Lehigh Gap in the Blue Mountain Ridge was virtually unoccupied, the Amerindians even called the area "Towamensing", literally meaning "The Wilderness",<ref
 name=Hazard></ref> though their summer foraging parties regularly traveled its trails.  Even today's nearest largest city to the north, Hazelton, PA was a swampy saddle that wouldn't be occupied until anthracite drew in settlers, save for a few reclusive hunters.  The Amerindian Trail over the barrier ridge of Broad Mountain known as the "Warriors Trail" (now essentially, PA 93, after becoming the Lehigh and Susquehanna Turnpike in 1804.) was known, and re-branded the Lausanne-Nescopeck Road when settlers did enter the area.  With little flat terrain, the soil was essentially unfarmable, so the only obvious industry before people learned the tricks of burning hard to sustain and ignite anthracite was timber, which Brenckman claims drove the company that formed the turnpike – and the Lehigh is a shallow river, making harvest of big logs and especially their transport, very difficult. Having a wagon road with sledges in winter lands covered in snow make the impossible merely difficult.  Once on the river, such logs can be rafted on the spring freshets, as floods were called in the day.

The historic name Lausanne Township (before 1808 reshuffling, based on the township (Pennsylvania) rules of local government as defined by the Pennsylvania Constitution) applied for all the territory north of the Lehigh Gap to the Luzerne County line in the Federalist-era's much larger Northampton County – the whole frontier region above the Lehigh Gap from around 1790 to 1808, and to 1827, when Mauch Chunk was split off. It is removed in time and repeated reorganizations of local government entities from the rump bit of land that is today's Lausanne, Pennsylvania, which is still along the County Line, and but the remains of the old township's size-wise, located along the extreme northern border of Carbon County, Pennsylvania.

Today there are only a few stone ruins at the site of the ephemeral community mentioned by nineteenth century historians as 'Lausanne', 'Lausanne Landing', and 'Lausanne Township', each signifying a frontier settlement which was a community occupied for most of three decades by a few permanent pioneers, but mainly by transient work crews, either building one way cargo boats, cutting down trees, or mining coal.

The Lehigh & Susquehanna Turnpike's buildings were erected alongside 'Landing Tavern' which had been erected along the Amerindian trail head of the mostly unimproved footpath between Lausanne and Nescopeck, before it ascended Broad Mountain and before it was acquired by investors and chartered (1804) as a toll road.  These buildings and others such as storehouses, a saw mill and the turnpike toll house were all located near the 'Delta' of the Nesquehoning, the wide shallow slopes in the flood prone mouth terrain at the confluence of the Lehigh coming westwards out of the Lehigh Gorge and the east flowing Nesquehoning Creek flowing down its steep sided deep ravine into the head end of the calm slack water lake running southwards at right angles to both from their merge.

Pioneering penetrations of mountainous terrain were spearheaded by traders and subsistence hunters gradually exploring the frontier with or without an Amerindian guide. Either of which were often followed by lumbermen harvesting the riches of the forest, the structural material which Lewis Mumford in his seminal study of the interrelationships between technology and societal development, "Technics and Civilization"'' noted:

Because of the valley's collision between warring ridgelines above the Lehigh's water gap where Broad Mountain, Nesquehoning Mountain, Pisgah Ridge, and Mauch Chunk Mountain all funnel waters into the long slack water pool where the Lehigh is slow and broad and lakelike under the shadow of the west face of Bear Mountain

Notes

References

Former municipalities in Pennsylvania
Geography of Carbon County, Pennsylvania
Geography of Northampton County, Pennsylvania
History of Carbon County, Pennsylvania
History of Northampton County, Pennsylvania